Nosophora semitritalis is a moth in the family Crambidae. It was described by Julius Lederer in 1863. It is found in China, Thailand, Taiwan and Japan.

References

Moths described in 1863
Spilomelinae
Moths of Asia